Veriano Luchetti (12 March 1939 – 23 April 2012) was an Italian tenor, whose career lasted from 1965 until the 1990s. He sang in operas rarely recorded, such as Gerusalemme and I Vespri Siciliani, the Italian versions of  Verdi French Grand operas Jérusalem and Les Vêpres Siciliennes and L'africana, the Italian version of  Meyerbeer French Grand opera L'Africaine.

References

External links

2012 deaths
1939 births
20th-century Italian male opera singers